Alexander Victor "Bill" Lyon (19 January 1886 – 13 January 1962) was an Australian rules footballer who played with University in the Victorian Football League in 1910 and 1911. He played for Footscray in the Victorian Football Association prior to joining University.

Sources

External links

1886 births
1962 deaths
Australian rules footballers from Victoria (Australia)
Australian Rules footballers: place kick exponents
Footscray Football Club (VFA) players
University Football Club players